Gold Line 8 of the Mumbai Metro is an Airport Express Line part of the metro system for the city of Mumbai & Navi Mumbai, India. It will serve direct Connectivity from CSMIA Airport in Mumbai to NMIA Airport in Navi Mumbai. The 40 km (25 mi) line is fully elevated. Eight metro stations have been proposed on this line with a frequency of 15 minutes.

References

Mumbai Metro lines